Arnold William Reinold  (19 June 1843 – 11 April 1921) was an English physicist.

Born in Hull, the son of shipbroker John Henry Arnold Reinold, he received his early education at the St Peter's School, York. In 1863 he matriculated to Brasenose College, Oxford where he studied mathematics. He became a fellow of Merton College, Oxford in December, 1866; a position which he resigned in 1869 upon marrying  Marian  Owen—the couple had one daughter and three sons. In 1869 he was appointed the first Lee's Reader in Physics at Christ Church, and was awarded an M.A. in 1870.

In 1871 he was named Examiner in Physics at Oxford. When the Royal Naval College, Greenwich was established in 1873, he was appointed Professor of Physics there; a post he held for the next 35 years. During most of his period at Greenwich he was a lecturer at Guy's Hospital. Between 1877–93, he collaborated with English physicist Arthur William Rucker on  series of papers about the properties of thin films. He was named a fellow of the Royal Society in 1883. During 1874–88 he was honorable secretary for the Physical Society of London, whereupon he was elected as president of the body.

References

1843 births
1921 deaths
Academics of the Royal Naval College, Greenwich
Alumni of Brasenose College, Oxford
Companions of the Order of the Bath
English physicists
Fellows of Merton College, Oxford
Fellows of the Royal Society
Presidents of the Physical Society
Scientists from Kingston upon Hull